Carlos Dante Olascuaga Viera  (born 22 July 1992) is a Peruvian footballer who currently plays as a winger for Ayacucho FC on loan from Universitario.

Club career
He was promoted to the Alianza Lima first team in 2008 by Richard Páez along with his team-mates Aldo Corzo and Felix Goyzueta. His official debut was against Coronel Bolognesi FC in a 1-2 loss for his side. He also played for the Alianza Lima U20 side.

In January 2011, Olascuaga was loaned out to Cienciano for the start of 2011 season. On 21 February 2011 he made his debut for Cienciano in Cusco against Sport Boys. Olascuaga entered the match in the 62nd minute replacing Fernando Masías, which ended in a 3-0 win for Cienciano. On 11 May 2011 Olascuaga scored his first professional goal in the 3rd minute in a home match against Juan Aurich, which ended 2-1 in favor of Cienciano.

In July 2014, Olascuaga was loaned to Portuguese side Académica for 12 months. He made his official debut against Sporting CP in a Primeira Liga match. On 4 February, he scored his first, and only, goal against União da Madeira.

Honours

Club
Universitario de Deportes
 Torneo Descentralizado (1): 2013

References

External links

1992 births
Living people
Footballers from Lima
Peruvian footballers
Peruvian expatriate footballers
Club Alianza Lima footballers
Cienciano footballers
Club Universitario de Deportes footballers
Associação Académica de Coimbra – O.A.F. players
Juan Aurich footballers
Club Deportivo Universidad César Vallejo footballers
Sport Rosario footballers
Sport Boys footballers
Ayacucho FC footballers
Peruvian Primera División players
Peruvian Segunda División players
Primeira Liga players
Association football forwards
Expatriate footballers in Portugal
Peruvian expatriate sportspeople in Portugal